Events in the year 1908 in Germany.

Incumbents

National level
 Kaiser – Wilhelm II
 Chancellor – Bernhard von Bülow

State level

Kingdoms
 King of Bavaria – Otto of Bavaria
 King of Prussia – Kaiser Wilhelm II
 King of Saxony – Frederick Augustus III of Saxony
 King of Württemberg – William II of Württemberg

Grand Duchies
 Grand Duke of Baden – Frederick II
 Grand Duke of Hesse – Ernest Louis
 Grand Duke of Mecklenburg-Schwerin – Frederick Francis IV
 Grand Duke of Mecklenburg-Strelitz – Adolphus Frederick V
 Grand Duke of Oldenburg – Frederick Augustus II
 Grand Duke of Saxe-Weimar-Eisenach – William Ernest

Principalities
 Schaumburg-Lippe – George, Prince of Schaumburg-Lippe
 Schwarzburg-Rudolstadt – Günther Victor, Prince of Schwarzburg-Rudolstadt
 Schwarzburg-Sondershausen – Charles Gonthier, Prince of Schwarzburg-Sondershausen
 Principality of Lippe – Leopold IV, Prince of Lippe
 Reuss Elder Line – Heinrich XXIV, Prince Reuss of Greiz (with Heinrich XIV, Prince Reuss Younger Line as regent)
 Reuss Younger Line – Heinrich XIV, Prince Reuss Younger Line
 Waldeck and Pyrmont – Friedrich, Prince of Waldeck and Pyrmont

Duchies
 Duke of Anhalt – Frederick II, Duke of Anhalt
 Duke of Brunswick – Duke John Albert of Mecklenburg (regent)
 Duke of Saxe-Altenburg – Ernst I, Duke of Saxe-Altenburg to 7 February, then Ernst II, Duke of Saxe-Altenburg
 Duke of Saxe-Coburg and Gotha – Charles Edward, Duke of Saxe-Coburg and Gotha
 Duke of Saxe-Meiningen – Georg II, Duke of Saxe-Meiningen

Colonial Governors
 Cameroon (Kamerun) – Theodor Seitz (3rd term)
 Kiaochow (Kiautschou) – Oskar von Truppel
 German East Africa (Deutsch-Ostafrika) – Georg Albrecht Freiherr von Rechenberg
 German New Guinea (Deutsch-Neuguinea) – Albert Hahl (2nd term)
 German Samoa (Deutsch-Samoa) – Wilhelm Solf
 German South-West Africa (Deutsch-Südwestafrika) – Bruno von Schuckmann
 Togoland – Johann Nepomuk Graf Zech auf Neuhofen

Events

 8 July – The paper coffee filter, created by German housewife Melitta Bentz, is patented.
 28 October – Daily Telegraph Affair
 date unknown 
German association football club BFC Nord 08 Berlin is founded.
Johann Heinrich von Bernstorff is appointed German ambassador to the United States.

Births

 26 January – Rupprecht Geiger, German painter (died 2009)
 27 January – Trude Eipperle, German operatic soprano (died 1997)
 4 February – Heinz Pollay, German equestrian (died 1979)
 10 February – Alfred Kranzfelder, German naval officer (died 1945)
 25 February – Karl Heinz Stroux, German actor, film- and theatredirector (died 1985)
 2 March – Walter Bruch, German electrical engineer (died 1990)
 7 March – Inge Viermetz, German official and defendant at the Nuremberg Trials (date of death unknown)
 12 March – Kurt Stöpel, German bicycle racer (died 1997)
 25 March – Helmut Käutner, German film director (died 1980)
 26 March – Hilde Krahwinkel Sperling, German tennis player (died 1981)
 15 April – Richard Löwenthal, German author and journalist (died 1991)
 19 April – Joseph Keilberth, German conductor (died 1968)
 7 May – Max Grundig, German entrepreneur (died 1989)
 19 May – Rolf Dahlgrün, German politician (died 1969)
 20 May – Carlo Otte, Nazi administrator 
 22 May – Gustav Jaenecke, German ice hockey player (died 1985)
 11 June – Karl Hein German athlete (died 1982)
 24 June – Hugo Distler, German composer (died 1942)
 31 July – Franz Meyers, German politician (died 2002)
 10 August – Hanan Rubin, German-born Israeli politician (died 1962)
 18 August – Heinrich Hellwege, German politician (died 1991)
 27 August – Karl Ernst Rahtgens, German officer (died 1944)
 22 September – Fritz Gunst, German water polo player (died 1992)
 9 October – Werner von Haeften, Oberleutnant in the Wehrmacht, who took part in the military-based conspiracy against Adolf Hitler known as the 20 July plot (died 1944)
 12 October – Georg Henneberg, German physician (died 1996)
 14 October – Rudolf Ismayr, German weightlifter (died 1998)
 25 October – Gotthard Handrick, German athlete and fighter pilot (died 1978)
 26 October – Richard Häussler, German actor (died 1964)
 11 November – Martin Held, German actor (died 1992)
 20 November – Louis, Prince of Hesse and by Rhine (died 1968)
 21 November – Franz Pfnür, German alpine skier (died 1996)

Deaths

 5 January – Joseph von Mering, German physician (born 1849)
 9 January – Wilhelm Busch, German humorist, poet, illustrator and painter (born 1832)
 22 January – August Wilhelmj, German violinist (born 1845)
 7 February – Ernst I, Duke of Saxe-Altenburg, nobleman (born 1826)
 24 March – Eduard von Pestel, Prussian military officer and German general (born 1821)
 27 March – Johann Georg Mönckeberg, politician (born 1839)
 26 April – Karl Möbius, German zoologist (born 1825)
 17 May:
 Jacques Blumenthal, German pianist and composer (born 1829)
 Carl Koldewey, German Arctic explorer (born 1837)
 4 June – Hermann von der Hude, German architect (born 1830)
 13 June – Henry Lomb, German-American optician, founder of Bausch & Lomb (born 1828)
 10 July – Gustav Karl Wilhelm Hermann Karsten, German botanist (born 1817)
 29 July – Cuno von Uechtritz-Steinkirch, German sculptor (born 1856)
 3 November – Harro Magnussen, German sculptor (born 1861)
 20 November – Albert Dietrich, conductor and composer (born 1829)

References

 
Years of the 20th century in Germany
Germany
Germany